Andrew Wylie may refer to:

Andrew Wylie (footballer), manager of Reading Football Club, England between 1926 and 1931
Andrew Wylie (college president) (1789–1851), first president of Indiana University
Andrew Wylie (judge) (1814–1905), US federal judge
Andrew Wylie (literary agent) (born 1947), agent for high-profile authors including Martin Amis, Salman Rushdie and Philip Roth
Andrew Wylie (American football) (born 1994), American football offensive tackle
Andrew Wylie (cricketer) (born 1971), South African cricketer
Andrew Wylie (skier) (born 1961), British Olympic skier
Sir Andrew Wylie, fictional protagonist of the novel Sir Andrew Wylie, of that Ilk (1822) by the novelist John Galt
Sir Andrew Graham Wylie (born 1959), British businessman

See also
Andrew Wyllie (pathologist), Scottish pathologist
Andrew Wyllie (engineer) (born 1962), Scottish civil engineer
Wylie (surname)